Macroglossum trochilus, the African hummingbird hawk-moth, is a moth of the family Sphingidae. The species was first described by Jacob Hübner in 1823. It is very common in most habitats throughout southern and eastern Africa and in the Comoro Islands.

Adults are frequently seen at flowers in full sunshine.

The length of the forewings is 15–18 mm. The antennae are blackish. The head and thorax are pale olive above and very pale buff below. The abdomen is pale olive above and orange laterally. The posterior segments are darker dorsally, with a yellow distal fringe. The anal fan is very dark brown, tipped with buff. The small lateral tufts are dark brown and white. The abdomen is reddish brown below. The forewings are brown with a series of darker transverse bands. The hindwings are orange with a very broad dark reddish brown border. Both wings are brownish red below.

References

 Pinhey, E. (1962): Hawk Moths of Central and Southern Africa. Longmans Southern Africa, Cape Town.

Macroglossum
Moths described in 1823
Moths of Africa
Moths of the Comoros